Cloy Brook Pastures is a Site of Special Scientific Interest in the preserved county of Clwyd, north Wales.

It is an area of wet pasture managed by grazing, with a variety of plants such as dyer’s greenweed, pepper saxifrage and spiny restharrow.

See also
List of Sites of Special Scientific Interest in Clwyd

References

Sites of Special Scientific Interest in Clwyd